The Hazel Hall House is in northwest Portland, in the U.S. state of Oregon. It is listed on the National Register of Historic Places. It was the home of poet Hazel Hall.

See also
 National Register of Historic Places listings in Northwest Portland, Oregon

References

Historic district contributing properties in Oregon
1921 establishments in Oregon
Bungalow architecture in Oregon
Houses completed in 1921
Houses on the National Register of Historic Places in Portland, Oregon
Northwest Portland, Oregon
Portland Historic Landmarks